Xustáns (Justanes in Spanish) is a parish located in the municipality of Ponte Caldelas, Spain. Population was 553 in 2013 Census. Xustáns is located NW Spain and SE Galicia. It is a countryside area close to the city of Pontevedra.

History 
The first human appearances were by 3000 BC on the hills southwest of the parish, between the hamlets of Baltar and O Sobreiro. Then, it is believed people stayed there as farmers until today. There are documents proving the existence of the town since Middle Ages. Since it is a lightly populated area, it was not important to name. The Catholic Church of San Martiño (O Sobreiro), was built in the 17th−18th century. By the 18th century, the old hamlet of Cotas (located between A Aluncía and Baltar) was abandoned. At the same time, the hamlet of Baltar started growing.

In 19th and 20th centuries many people migrated to the closest cities (mostly Pontevedra) and countries like Argentina, Cuba, Brazil.

Today, the parish is still a countryside area even with the appearance of an industrial park in the 1980s on its north side.

Geography 
The parish is located on the west side of the municipality of Ponte Caldelas. It lies adjacent to the parishes of Tourón (N), Ponte Caldelas (E), Taboadelo (S) and on the west with the parishes of Tomeza and Marcón.

Natural borders are A Fracha mountains (W) and San Vicente River (E). The main river on the parish is the Guisal River, which makes a valley where the hamlets are.

Demographics

1999 Census 
The 1999 Census said the population of the parish was 561 (270 men and 291 women). Only 13.5% of the people were 16 or younger. The main age group was the one who was between 16 and 65 (63.3%) and 23.2% were 65 or older. 6% of the people were illiterate and only 1.6% had a college degree. Also, 84% of the buildings were built before 1950.

References 

Parishes of Galicia (Spain)